Liberty Street Ferry Terminal or Liberty Street Terminal was the Central Railroad of New Jersey's passenger ferry slip in lower Manhattan, New York City and the point of departure and embarkation for passengers travelling on the Central Railroad of New Jersey, Baltimore and Ohio Railroad, Reading Railroad and the Lehigh Valley Railroad from the Communipaw Terminal across the Hudson River in Jersey City.

History

Service by the Communipaw ferry dated back to 1661, from the village of Communipaw during the Dutch colonial period.
The terminal opened in 1865 following the completion of the Central Railroad of New Jersey's Communipaw Terminal. By the late 1960s the Jersey Central opted to close its station at Communipaw and the last ferry departed the terminal for Jersey City on April 26, 1967, bringing to an end 306 years of Communipaw ferry operations. The terminal was subsequently demolished and the waterfront was filled in to create Battery Park City in the early 1970s. 

The Cortland Street Ferry Depot, operated by the Pennsylvania Railroad and the West Shore Railroad, was located directly next to the terminal and also provided ferry service across the North River from lower Manhattan to their railroad terminals at Exchange Place and Weehawken, respectively. The terminal was located one block west of the Ninth Avenue Elevated's Cortland Street Station which operated from 1874 until 1940.

During the 1980s ferry service across the Hudson was restored by NY Waterway and it has subsequently been expanded. Today the Battery Park City Ferry Terminal is located a few blocks north of where Liberty Street Ferry Terminal and Cortland Street Ferry Depot once stood.

See also
Whitehall Terminal
Chambers Street Ferry Terminal
Cortland Street Ferry Depot
Battery Park City Ferry Terminal

Gallery

References

External links
Central Railroad of New Jersey Ferries (National Railroad Postcard Museum; Thursday, October 15, 2015)

Ferries of New York City
Water transportation in New York City
Ferry terminals in Manhattan
Demolished buildings and structures in Manhattan
1865 establishments in New York (state)
Central Railroad of New Jersey
Baltimore and Ohio Railroad
Transit hubs serving New Jersey